Kaleidoscope World is an early song by New Zealand band The Chills. It appeared as the first track on the Dunedin Double, a seminal EP shared between four bands, which launched those bands' careers nationally and internationally (the other bands were Sneaky Feelings, The Verlaines, and The Stones).

While not strictly a single, and never released as such, Kaleidoscope World is regarded as an early Chills manifesto. Written by Chills frontman Martin Phillipps, "Kaleidoscope World" was, like many other early releases from the Flying Nun label, recorded in very lo-fi surroundings, on Chris Knox's four-track tape by Doug Hood in a room at Paul Kean's house. The line-up of the Chills that recorded the song consisted of Martin Phillipps (guitar/vocals), Alan Haig (guitar), Frazer Batts (keyboards) and Terry Moore (bass).

The song features a swirl of jingle-jangle guitar over a background bass pulse and quiet synth, and is a prototype and epitome of what came to be known as the "Dunedin sound". The EP, and "Kaleidoscope World" in particular, were the launching pad for Dunedin's acceptance as an important source of New Zealand music. As engineer Doug Hood said of the track: "It was the one that made you think, boy, there's really something special happening here."

The song became the title track of The Chills' 1986 compilation Kaleidoscope World, which collated all the band's early single and EP releases.

References

Flying Nun Records
The Chills songs